RNA-binding motif, single-stranded-interacting protein 3 is a protein that in humans is encoded by the RBMS3 gene.

References

RNA
Proteins
Genes